"Wetsuit / Tiger Blood" is a single from English indie rock band the Vaccines from their debut album, What Did You Expect from The Vaccines?. The single was released in the United Kingdom as a digital download on 11 December 2011. It was also released as on 7" vinyl limited to 500 copies. The single debuted at number 164 on the UK Singles Chart.

Music video
A music video to accompany the release of "Wetsuit" was first released onto YouTube on 5 October 2011; at a total length of three minute and fifty-five seconds. This was the world's first Instagram crowdsourced music video.

Track listing

Credits and personnel
Performed by – The Vaccines
Produced by – Dan Grech-Marguerat ("Wetsuit"), Albert Hammond Jr. & Gus Oberg ("Tiger Blood")
Engineered by – Gus Oberg ("Tiger Blood")
Lyrics – Justin Hayward-Young
Music – The Vaccines
Label – Columbia Records

Chart performance

Release history

References

2011 singles
The Vaccines songs
Columbia Records singles